

RQ-3A Darkstar UAV / classified Darkstar follow-on

The Gnat 750 and Predator were the first in a series of "Tier UAVs" considered by the US Air Force. In the USAF plan, the Gnat 750 was known as "Tier 1", while the Predator was known as "Tier 2". The original expectation was that the series would then move on to a very large and powerful long-range UAV known as "Tier 3", something along the lines of a B-2 Stealth bomber, but Tier 3 proved overambitious and was cancelled.

In place of Tier 3, the USAF decided to develop a smaller "Tier 3-" UAV designated the "Darkstar", and a "Tier 2+" UAV, something like a "super Predator", the Teledyne-Ryan "Global Hawk".

The Lockheed Martin / Boeing Tier 3- Darkstar was a stealth capable design that resembled a big pumpkin seed with a long straight wing at the rear. It was designed to send real-time still images produced by either SAR or EO sensors, though it did not have the capacity to carry both sensors at the same time. Data was to be returned using a satellite communications link with a bandwidth of 1.5 megabits per second. The Darkstar was intended to penetrate protected airspace to observe high-value targets for a limited amount of time. Range and endurance were intended to be similar to that of the Predator, though the Darkstar's sensor suite could cover over twice the area, and it was harder to detect.

The Darkstar was powered by a Williams Research FJ-44-1A turbofan engine with 8.46 kN (862 kgf / 1,900 lbf) thrust, and could carry a  payload. The UAV was to cost about US$10 million each.

The Darkstar was unlucky. On its second takeoff in the spring of 1996, it stood up on one wing and slammed into the runway, bursting into fire and smoke. An analysis of the failure showed flight software and takeoff procedures to be faulty.

The Air Force and the contractors did not give up right away, and a redesigned Darkstar, now formally designated "RQ-3A", flew in the early summer of 1998. However, the program was still unhealthy, and the Darkstar was cancelled in early 1999. Although flight tests were generally satisfactory, the Darkstar was by no means close to being a useful operational system. Building an actual operational UAV based on the Darkstar would have required major redesign and improvement, and the costs were more than the Air Force was willing to spend.
 In the summer of 2003, confirming rumors that had been in circulation for some time, Air Force officials announced that Lockheed Martin's "Skunk Works" had developed several prototypes of a stealthy reconnaissance UAV similar to the DarkStar but larger, and that this machine had been used in an operational evaluation over Iraq during the American invasion of that country in the spring of 2003.

The unnamed UAV's payload was described as less than that of a Lockheed U-2, featuring a "low probability of intercept (LPI)" SAR and electro-optic sensors, along with a SATCOM datalink. Range was less than that of the Global Hawk, described below, though cost is described as several times greater. The Air Force wanted to conduct the operational evaluation to see if putting the new machine into production was worthwhile. The most likely operational base for the UAV was Al Udeid Air Base in Qatar, which has extensive and well-developed facilities, is near to Iraq, and was off-limits to reporters during the invasion of Iraq.

Sources have also leaked information about a roughly comparable Boeing effort to develop a stealth UAV test bed. This particular machine is said to have been flown in a wide range of configurations, with different tails, noses, and wings, to validate stealth concepts.

This UAV was declassified in 2006 as the Lockheed Martin Polecat.

Northrop Grumman RQ-4A Global Hawk/sensor craft

With the ultimate demise of the Darkstar project, the Ryan RQ-4A Global Hawk became the Air Force's great hope for a strategic UAV reconnaissance platform. With the purchase of Ryan by Northrop Grumman in July 1999, the aircraft became the Northrop Grumman Global Hawk.

In comparison to the Predator, if a Global Hawk were flown out of San Francisco, it would be able to operate in Maine for 24 hours, observe a  grid, and then fly back home.

The fuselage is mostly of conventional aluminum airframe construction, while the wings are made of carbon composite.

The Global Hawk carries the "Hughes Integrated Surveillance & Reconnaissance (HISAR)" sensor system. HISAR is a lower-cost derivative of the ASARS-2 package that Hughes developed for the Lockheed U-2. HISAR is also fitted in the US Army's RC-7B Airborne Reconnaissance Low Multifunction (ARLM) manned surveillance aircraft, and is being sold on the international market. HISAR integrates a SAR-MTI system, along with an optical and an infrared imager. All three sensors are controlled and their outputs filtered by a common processor. The digital sensor data can be transmitted at up to 50 Mbit/s to a ground station in real time, either directly or through a communications satellite link.

The SAR-MTI system operates in the X-band and provides a number of operational modes:
 The SAR spot mode can provide  resolution over ten square kilometers (3.8 square miles), as well as provide a sea-surveillance function.

The visible and infrared imagers share the same gimballed sensor package, and use common optics, providing a telescopic close-up capability. The Global Hawk is also fitted with a "self-protection" countermeasures suite to help it frustrate adversary air defenses, and can be optionally fitted with an auxiliary SIGINT package.

The first flight of the Global Hawk was on 28 February 1998. Five prototypes were built, and put through a thorough flight test program. Beginning in the spring of 1999, the Global Hawk performed a series of operational evaluation flights, some of which were remarkable demonstrations of the aircraft's capability. One of the prototypes flew from Eglin Air Force Base in Florida to Alaska and back again, nonstop, in just under 25 hours.

In May 2000, a prototype flew up the Atlantic coast of the US from Eglin AFB, transmitting radar images to a US Army ground station at Fort Bragg, North Carolina, and the aircraft carrier USS George Washington, at dock at Norfolk, Virginia. The RQ-4A then proceeded across the Atlantic, monitoring shipping movements, and reached its final target, an amphibious landing exercise near Setubal, Portugal. Once done, the Global Hawk retraced its route and landed at Eglin, 28 hours after its departure.

The program has suffered some setbacks. On 29 March 1999, the second prototype fell out of the sky over the US Navy China Lake military training area in California and was destroyed.

The Global Hawk was scheduled to reach operational service in late 2001, and this timeframe coincided with the US intervention in Afghanistan. Four Global Hawks were available at the time, though only three were regarded as suitable for operations. These three UAVs were operated in the war, though specific details of their missions are unclear. One crashed on 30 December 2001 due to a malfunction.

Global Hawks also served in the invasion of Iraq in the spring of 2003. Although details of their service there are largely classified for the moment, reportedly their SAR payload came in very handy for pinning down targets during intense sandstorms. Ironically, despite the service of the Global Hawks in these conflicts, none of them that flew these operations were actually regarded as production machines. The first production RQ-4A, the eighth Global Hawk built, was finally rolled out in the summer of 2003.
 The Global Hawk is a very high priority program for the Air Force. The service expects to obtain two Block 5 aircraft each year, and then move on to Block 10 aircraft when the system has been proven. The Block 10 aircraft will feature an improved sensor and self-protection suite, and more electrical power.

The improved self-protection suite includes an AN/ALE-50 towed decoy, an AN/ALR-89 radar-warning receiver, and a new self-defense jammer being designed by Raytheon. The UAV will autonomously act on the information from the self-protection system, deciding whether to abort the mission, take evasive action, or continue with the towed jammer deployed. The remote operator can override whatever decision is taken.
 One high-profile update for the Global Hawk is now being pursued under the "Multi-Platform Radar Technology Insertion Program (MP-RTIP)", which will give the UAV an advanced "active electronically scanned array (AESA)" multifunction radar.

MP-RTIP originally started out as an upgrade program for the "E-8 Joint-STARS" manned battlefield reconnaissance aircraft, which is based on the Boeing 707-320 jetliner, but the scope of the program expanded to envision the development of an AESA that could be adapted for use on a range of platforms.

An AESA can be thought of as a radio-frequency (RF) "array processor", composed of a grid of interconnected "transmit-receive" modules, each with its own RF, processing, and control electronics. The modules can work with each other to perform a wide variety of tasks. The AESA is scalable, allowing the fit of more or fewer modules as allowed by the size of the platform, with capability proportional to size. The AESA can perform communications, jamming, and sensing functions in parallel through juggling the use of its modules. Current thinking on the Global Hawk AESA is also placing increased emphasis on providing airborne search functions to the system to allow the UAV to operate as an "airborne early warning (AEW)" platform.

Raytheon and Northrop Grumman were awarded a contract for the MP-RTIP system in late 2000, with Raytheon to build the AESA and the Northrop Grumman to perform systems integration. The Global Hawk was selected as the initial target system for MP-RTIP, with initial flight tests in 2005.
 Yet another high-priority update that is being considered for the Global Hawk is to fit it with a SIGINT payload. This option was being considered as a long-term program until the spring of 2001, when a Chinese F-8 fighter trying to "spook" a US Navy EP-3 Aries SIGINT aircraft cruising off the Chinese coast collided with it instead. The F-8 and its pilot were lost, and the EP-3 was forced to make an emergency landing on Hainan Island. The result was a protracted diplomatic quarrel, with the Chinese holding the aircraft and the crew and demanding that the US end surveillance of Chinese territory. The crew was returned unharmed, but the Chinese refused to let the EP-3 fly out, forcing the Americans to retrieve with a leased Antonov transport.

The 1969 shootdown of an EC-121 SIGINT aircraft by the North Koreans led to the development of the "Combat Dawn" Firefly variant, and the 2001 incident led to widespread discussion of adopting a similar strategy to ensure that the problem would not arise again. While the Global Hawk does not have the payload capability to replace a large SIGINT aircraft like the EP-3, it would provide an interim solution if nothing else were available. The Global Hawk SIGINT payload is now a high priority.

Other upgrades are also being considered, such as a fast-track effort to add stores pylons for external payloads, including improved electro-optic / infrared and multispectral sensors; or jamming pods. While a Global Hawk configuration carrying two  or four  GPS-guided bombs has been considered, senior Air Force brass are not enthusiastic about arming the type, since that would make it politically more difficult to use in peacekeeping operations or to obtain overflight permission from friendly nations.

Another possible role is for "information warfare (IW)", picking up and penetrating enemy voice, video, and data communications, but currently no miniaturized IW payload suitable for the Global Hawk is available. Northrop Grumman is promoting schemes where several Global Hawks with different but complementary payloads could be used to perform a single mission.

Current USAF plans projected 40 to 45 Global Hawks in service by 2010 and 78 in service by 2020, with 40 carrying electro-optic payloads and the other 38 carrying SIGINT payloads. The Air Force expects to retire their aging U-2 reconnaissance aircraft no later than 2011, and are hesitantly considering the Global Hawk as the replacement. Lockheed Martin has been promoting a UAV version of the U-3 designated the "U-2U" as an alternative to the Global Hawk, though so far with little success in the face of current Air Force commitments.

Northrop Grumman is now building the "Block 20" or "RQ-4B" Global Hawk.
 Following the conflict in Afghanistan, the US Navy also became interested in the Global Hawk, ordering two for delivery in 2005. The two UAVs will be used to evaluate concepts for a naval endurance UAV under the "Broad Area Maritime Surveillance (BAMS)" program. BAMS would complement manned maritime patrol aircraft, such as the P-3C Orion or its successor, the Boeing 737-based "Multimission Maritime Aircraft (MMA)", and the Navy would like to field BAMS by 2008.

It would carry an extensive payload suite, with EO/IR imaging sensors; a radar with sea-air-land wide-area search, high-resolution spot beam, MTI, and SAR imaging modes; and a SIGINT package with emitter identification and targeting capabilities. Payload systems will be modular, and it may not be possible to carry a complete suite on a single machine.

BAMS would operate from land bases, but it could be controlled by airborne and maritime platforms as well. Navy officials say they have not selected the Global Hawk for the application, but have also indicated they basically want to modify an off-the-shelf UAV instead of building one from scratch, and so the Global Hawk is a high-profile candidate. However, General Atomics and Lockheed Martin are aggressively pursuing the BAMS requirement as well, offering a "Predator B-ER (Extended Range)" known as the "Mariner" with more power, payload, and endurance, and with the capability to carry an AESA radar up to 16 air-dropped sensors or munitions. The BAMS requirement remains completely up in the air for the moment.

Northrop Grumman has been trying to sell the Global Hawk internationally, and has had European interest in a EuroHawk and Middle Eastern interest in a "GulfHawk". Japan and Australia are considering the type as well, but nobody expects international sales any time soon.
 Northrop Grumman has conducted preliminary investigations for the USAF Research Lab of a follow-on HALE vehicle, known as the "Sensor Craft", which would have greater endurance and payload. One Northrop Grumman concepts features a diamond-shaped "joined wing" airfoil, with long conventional airfoil extensions. Boeing has also produced Sensor Craft concepts, featuring a pure joined-wing airfoil.

Sensor Craft appears to be a purely experimental program, but the confrontation between the US and China over the EP-3 SIGINT aircraft in the spring of 2001 helped increase interest in a new, large surveillance UAV. Many defense officials are now promoting acquisition of a large, capable UAV designated the "U-X" with stealthy characteristics that can fly at altitudes above the ceiling of a piloted interceptor.`

The UAV would not necessarily be designed to overfly protected airspace. One or two dozen such UAVs would be bought at a minimum total price of $1.5 billion USD. Ironically, if the new UAV is built, it will bring the US full circle, back to the "Tier 3" UAV that was cancelled early in the 1990s.

References

This article contains material that originally came from the web article Unmanned Aerial Vehicles by Greg Goebel, which exists in the Public Domain.

Unmanned military aircraft of the United States